Jeff Raatz is a member of the Indiana Senate, representing the 27th District. A member of the Republican Party, he elected to the State Senate in 2014. He has a bachelor's degree in business from Baker College and a master's degree in political science from Miami University. He previously served in the United States Army.

References

Living people
Republican Party Indiana state senators
21st-century American politicians
1963 births